Solan is a town in northern India.

Solan may also refer to:
related to the town:
 Solan district, a district in northern India
 Solan (Vidhan Sabha constituency)
 Solan railway station
people with the name:
 Solan (Xena: Warrior Princess), fictional character
 Eilon Solan, Israeli mathematician and writer
 Ken Solan, English footballer
 Lawrence Solan (born 1952), American Professor of Law at Brooklyn Law School 
 Peter Solan (director), Slovak film director
 Peter Solan (Gaelic footballer)
 Ramzi Solan, Saudi Arabian footballer

See also 
 Solans, a surname
 Sohlan
 Solan goose